The Third Book of Enoch (abbreviated as 3 Enoch)  is a Biblical apocryphal book in Hebrew. 3 Enoch purports to have been written in the 2nd century, but its origins can only be traced to the 5th century. Other names for 3 Enoch include The Book of the Palaces, The Book of Rabbi Ishmael the High Priest and The Revelation of Metatron. 

Most commonly, the Book of Enoch refers to 1 Enoch, which survived completely only in Ge'ez. There is also a Second Book of Enoch, which has survived only in Old Slavonic, although Coptic fragments were also identified in 2009. None of the three books are considered canonical scripture by the majority of Jewish or Christian bodies.

The name "3 Enoch" was coined by Hugo Odeberg for his first critical edition of 1928. The oldest printed text of 3 Enoch appears to be the Derus Pirqe Hekalot. It covers 3:1-12:5 and 15:1-2, and it is dated by A. E. Cowley to around 1650.

Content
Modern scholars describe this book as pseudepigraphal, as it says it is written by "Rabbi Ishmael" who became a "high priest" after visions of ascension to Heaven. This has been taken as referring to Rabbi Ishmael, a 3rd generation Tanna and a leading figure of Merkabah mysticism. However, this Ishmael lived after the Siege of Jerusalem (70 AD) and the destruction of the Second Temple in 70 AD. He thus could not have been a High Priest of Israel. An alternative identification would be the earlier Tanna Ishmael ben Elisha, who lived through the Siege of Jerusalem.

The name Sefer Hekhalot (Hekhalot meaning palaces or temples), along with its proposed author, places this book as a member of Hekalot or Merkabah mysticism. Its contents suggest that 3 Enoch's contents and ideas are newer than those shown in other Merkabah texts. The book does not contain Merkabah hymns, it has a unique layout and adjuration. All these facts make 3 Enoch unique not just among Merkabah writings, but also within the writings of Enoch.

3 Enoch contains a number of Greek and Latin words. The book appears to have been originally written in Hebrew. There are a number of indications suggesting that the writers of 3 Enoch had knowledge of, and most likely read, 1 Enoch.

Some points that appear in 1 Enoch and 3 Enoch are:
 Enoch ascends to Heaven in a storm chariot (3 Enoch 6:1; 7:1)
 Enoch is transformed into an angel (3 Enoch 9:1–5; 15:1–2)
 Enoch as an exalted angel is enthroned in Heaven (3 Enoch 10:1–3; 16:1)
 Enoch receives a revelation of cosmological secrets of creation (3 Enoch 13:1–2)
 The story about precious metals and how they will not avail their users and those that make idols from them (3 Enoch 5:7–14)
 Hostile angels named 'Uzza, 'Azza, and Azaz'el/Aza'el challenge Enoch before God (3 Enoch 4:6) and are mentioned again in passing (5:9)

The main themes running through 3 Enoch are the ascension of Enoch into Heaven and his transformation into the angel Metatron.

See also
 Book of Enoch
 Second Book of Enoch
 Hekhalot literature
 Kabbalah: Primary texts

References

External links
 Hugo Odeberg (1928). 3 Enoch or The Hebrew Book of Enoch
 The Etymology of the Name "Metatron"
 Hebrew book of 3 Enoch (in English translation)
 Text of 3 Enoch (in English translation)
 William Morfill  (1896). 2 Enoch or The Book of the Secrets of Enoch
 Solomonn Malan (1882). The Book of Adam and Eve, also called The Conflict of Adam & Eve Against Satan

5th-century books
Ancient Hebrew texts
 3
Kabbalah texts
Merkabah mysticism
Old Testament pseudepigrapha
Jewish apocrypha